P57 is an oxypregnane steroidal glycoside isolated from the African cactiform Hoodia gordonii.  P57 is hypothesized to be the chemical constituent from this plant mainly responsible for the putative appetite suppressant activity of Hoodia extracts.

In a rat study at Brown Medical School, intracerebroventricular injections of the purified P57 demonstrated that the compound has a likely central nervous system (CNS) mechanism of action like that of neuroactive steroids.
  The studies demonstrated that the compound increases the content of ATP by 50-150% in hypothalamic neurons.  In addition, third ventricle administration of P57 reduced subsequent 24-hour food intake by 40-60%.

See also 
 Anorectic, for additional information about appetite suppressants
 Neuroactive steroid

References 

Anorectics
Steroidal glycosides